Jaume Comas Gil (1936 – 21 December 2021) was a Spanish screenwriter and film producer.

Comas wrote the screenplay for Fistful of Dollars (1964) along with A. Bonzzoni, Víctor Andrés Catena and Sergio Leone; Il cacciatore di squali (1979), directed by Enzo G. Castellari; and La sfinge d'oro (1967) along with Raphael Sanchez Campoy, Adriano Bolzoni and José Antonio Biondi.

He founded Ocean Films.

Comas died on 21 December 2021, at the age of 85. His funeral was held at Iglesia de Santa María de Caná on 19 January 2022 in Pozuelo de Alarcón.

Filmography

References

External links

1936 births
2021 deaths
Date of birth missing
Spanish film producers
Spanish male screenwriters
People from Terrassa